The Lewis and Clark Memorial Column is an outdoor monument by artist Otto Schumann, dedicated to Meriwether Lewis and William Clark for their expedition and located at Washington Park in Portland, Oregon.

Description
The sculpture, made of Snake River granite, is a Classical column with a sphere on top. It is approximately 34 feet, 6 inches tall, with a diameter of 2.5 feet. The obelisk sits on a square base that is approximately 5 feet, 5 inches tall. The base's sides display bronze seals for the states of Oregon, Washington, Idaho and Montana, which once comprised the Oregon Territory. An illuminated path leads up the monument. According to the Smithsonian Institution, the work is administered by City of Portland's Metropolitan Arts Commission.

History
The memorial was commissioned around 1902 by the Lewis & Clark Exposition Commission for approximately $10,500 as a "gift of the people of Oregon in memory" of the duo. President Theodore Roosevelt laid the first cornerstone on May 21, 1903, and the piece was completed and dedicated in 1908. It was surveyed and considered "well maintained" by Smithsonian's "Save Outdoor Sculpture!" program in November 1993.

See also
 1908 in art
 Captain William Clark Monument, University of Portland
 Lewis and Clark (sculpture), Salem, Oregon
 Sacajawea and Jean-Baptiste (1905), Portland, Oregon

References

External links
 

1908 establishments in Oregon
1908 sculptures
Bronze sculptures in Oregon
Cultural depictions of Meriwether Lewis and William Clark
Granite sculptures in Oregon
Lewis and Clark Centennial Exposition
Monuments and memorials in Portland, Oregon
Monuments and memorials to explorers
Outdoor sculptures in Portland, Oregon
Washington Park (Portland, Oregon)
World's fair sculptures